Konrad Osterwalder (born June 3, 1942) is a Swiss mathematician and physicist, former Undersecretary-General of the United Nations, former Rector of the United Nations University (UNU), and Rector Emeritus of the Swiss Federal Institute of Technology Zurich (ETH Zurich). He is known for the Osterwalder–Schrader theorem.

United Nations University
Osterwalder was appointed to the position of United Nations Under Secretary General and United Nations University Rector by United Nations Secretary-General Ban Ki-moon May 2007 and served until 28 February 2013. He succeeded Prof. Hans van Ginkel from the Netherlands to be the fifth Rector of the United Nations University.

He is credited with turning United Nations University into a world leading institution, ranked #5 & #6 in two categories according to the 2012 Global Go to Think Tank Rankings. He was responsible for ensuring that UNU's charter was amended by the United Nations General Assembly in 2009 allowing the United Nations University to grant degrees, introducing UNU's degree programmes and creating a new concept in education, research and development by introducing the twin institute programmes. A concept that is changing the way that development, aid and capacity building is approached both by developed countries and developing and least developed countries.

Bologna Process

In March 2000, following the Bologna Declaration by 28 European Education Ministers, the European University Association and the Comite de Liaison within the National Rector's Conference convened the Convention of European Higher Education in Salamanca Spain, hereinafter referred to as the "Salamanca Process" with the aim of discussing the Bologna Declaration and delivering an overall, univocal response to the Council of Ministers. Professor Osterwalder, Rector of ETH, was chosen by the conference as the Rapporteur of the Salamanca Process and the voice of Higher Education institutions.  The meeting concluded with a declaration and a report that led to the basis of Higher Education reform within the Bologna process and the EU.  In addition, the two conveners of the conference formed the European University Association.

Life and career

Konrad Osterwalder was born in Frauenfeld, Thurgau, Switzerland, in June 1942. He studied at the Swiss Federal Institute of Technology (Eidgenössische Technische Hochschule; ETH) in Zurich, where he earned a Diploma in theoretical physics in 1965 and a Doctorate in theoretical physics in 1970. He is married to Verena Osterwalder-Bollag, an analytical therapist. They have three children.

After one year with the Courant Institute of Mathematical Sciences, New York University, he accepted a research position at Harvard University with Arthur Jaffe in 1971. He remained on the faculty of Harvard for seven years, and was promoted to Assistant Professor for Mathematical Physics in 1973 and Associate Professor for Mathematical Physics in 1976. In 1977, he returned to Switzerland upon being appointed a full Professor for Mathematical Physics at ETH Zurich. His doctoral students include Felix Finster and Emil J. Straube.

During his tenure at ETH Zurich, Osterwalder served as Head of the Department of Mathematics (1986–1990) and Head of the Planning Committee (1990–1995), and was founder of the Centro Stefano Franscini seminar center in Ascona. He was appointed Rector of ETH in 1995 and held that post for 12 years. From November 2006 through August 2007, he also served concurrently as ETH President pro tempore.

On 1 September 2007, Osterwalder joined the United Nations University as its fifth rector. In that role, he held the rank of Under-Secretary-General of the United Nations.

Osterwalder's research focused on the mathematical structure of relativistic quantum field theory as well as on elementary particle physics and statistical mechanics. During his long and distinguished career, he has been a Visiting Fellow/Guest Professor at several prominent universities around the world, including the Institut des Hautes Études Scientifiques (IHES; Bures-sur-Yvette, France); Harvard University; University of Texas (Austin); Max Planck Institute for Physics and Astrophysics (Munich), Università La Sapienza (Rome); Università di Napoli; Waseda University; and Weizmann Institute of Science (Rehovot, Israel).

Since 2014 - member of International Scientific Council of Tomsk Polytechnic University.

Career achievements
Osterwalder career encompasses service on many advisory boards, committees and associations including as

 Editor of Communications in Mathematical Physics;
 Treasurer and president of the International Association of Mathematical Physics;
 Member of the visiting committee of the Harvard Department of Physics;
 President of the IHÉS National Committee of the Swiss Academy of Natural Sciences;
 Member of the advisory council of the Euler Institute in St. Petersburg;
 Vice-president of the Conference of Rectors of Swiss Universities;
 President of the Conference of European Schools of Advanced Engineering Education and Research (CESAER);
 Member of the International Academic Advisory Panel of the Government of Singapore;
 President of UNITECH International (a collaboration between several European Technical Universities and more than 20 leading multinational corporations);
 Chairman of the Bologna-Project Group (Swiss Rectors Conference);
 President, Jury of the Brandenberger Foundation;
 Member of the Nucleo di Valutazione (supervisory council) of the Politecnico di Milano;
 Member of the Conseil d'administration of the École Polytechnique de France (Paris);
 Member of the "Comité de l´Enseignement" of the Ecole Nationale Supérieure des Mines de Paris;
 Member of the University Council of the Università della Svizzera Italiana;
 President chair of the University Council of the Technical University Darmstadt;
 Head of the Evaluationsverbund Darmstadt-Kaiserslautern-Karlsruhe;
 Member, Strategic Council, Free University of Berlin;
 Member, Comitato Scientifico Alta Scuola Politecnica (Politecnici di Milano e di Torino);
 Member, Beirat Robert Bosch Stiftung; and
 Member, Academic Council of the International Council on Systems Engineering (INCOSE)
 Member, Consiglio Fondazione Italian Institute of Technology
 Member, The International Selection committee for the Millennium Technology Prize, the world’s biggest technology prize (1.5 Million US$), awarded by the Technology Academy Finland
 Executive Committee Member, Club of Rome

Awards and prizes
Osterwalder has been a recipient of many honours and prizes including:

 having one of the top-cited mathematical physics papers of all time
 Fellow of the Alfred P. Sloan Foundation (1974–1978);
 member of the Swiss Academy of Technical Sciences;
 Honorary degree from the Helsinki Technical University
 Honorary Member of Riga Technical University.
 2009 Matteo Ricci International Award
 2010 Leonardo da Vinci Medal (SEFI, European Society for Engineering Education)
 1987 until 1995 awarded by ETH's students the prize of the best teacher of the term
 Fellow of the American Mathematical Society, 2012.

Publications

Cluster Properties of the S-Matrix, diploma thesis, unpublished
Boson Fields with the λ ϕ3 Interaction in Two, Three and Four Dimensions,Ph. D. thesis, published by Physikalisches Intitut ETH, Zürich (1970)
On the Hamiltonian of the Cubic Boson Self-Interaction in Four Dimensional Space Time, Fortschritte der Physik  19, 43-113 (1971)
On the Spectrum of the Cubic Boson Self-Interaction, ETH Preprint (1971)
On the Uniqueness of the Hamiltonian and of the Representation of the CCR for the Quartic Boson Interaction in Three Dimensions, Helv. Phys. Acta . 44, 884-909 (1971), with J.-P. Eckmann
Duality for Free Bose Fields, Comm. Math. Phys. 29, 1-14 (1973)
On the Uniqueness of the Energy Density in the Infinite Volume Limit for Quantum Field Models, Helv. Phys. Acta. 45, 746-754 (1972), with R. Schrader
An Application of Tomita’s Theory of Modular Hilbert Algebras: Duality for Free Bose Fields, Jour. Funct. Anal. 13, 1-12 (1973), with J.-P. Eckmann
Feynman-Kac Formula for Euclidean Fermi and Bose Fields, Phys. Rev. Lett. 29, 1423-1425 (1971), with R. Schrader
Axioms for Euclidean Green’s Functions, Comm. Math. Phys. 31, 83-113, (1973),with R. Schrader
Euclidean Fermi Fields and Feynman-Kac Formula for  Boson-Fermion Models, Helv. Phys. Acta.  46, 277-302 (1973), with R. Schrader
Euclidean Green’s Functions and Wightman Distributions, in Constructive Quantum Field Theory, G. Velo and A. Wightman (eds.), 1973 Erice Lectures,  Vol. 25, Springer-Verlag, Berlin -  Heidelberg - New York (1973); Russian translation, MIR 1977
Euclidean Fermi Fields, in Constructive Quantum Field Theory, G. Velo and A. Wightman (eds.), 1973 Erice Lectures, Lecture Notes in Physics, Vol 25, Springer Verlag, Berlin-Heidelberg-New York, (1973); Russian translation, MIR 1977
Axioms for Euclidean Green’s Functions, II, Comm. Math. Phys. 42, 281 (1975), with R. Schrader; Russian translation in: Euclidean Quantum Field Theory, MIR 1978
Is there a Euclidean Field Theory for Fermions, Helv. Phys. Acta. 47, 781 (1974), with J. Fröhlich
The Wightman Axioms and the Mass Gap for Weakky Coupled (φ4)3 Quantum Field Theories, Ann. of Phys. 97, 80-135 (1976), with J. Feldman
The Wightman Axioms and the  Mass Gap for Weakly Coupled  (φ4)3 Quantum Field Theories,  Proc. of the International Symposium on Mathematical Problems in Theoretical Physics, Kyoto Japan, January 23–29, 1975. Lecture Notes in Physics, Springer-Verlag, with Joel Feldman
Recent Results in Constructive Quantum Field Theory (in Japanese), Kagaku, June 1975
The Construction of  λ (φ4)3  Quantum Field Models, in Colloques Internationaux C.N.R.S. No. 248, les méthodes mathématiques de la théorie quantique des champs (1975), with J. Feldman
A Nontrivial Scattering Matrix for Weakly Coupled  P(ϕ)2 Models, Helv. Phys. Acta. 49, 525 (1976), with R. Sénéor
Time Ordered Operator Products and the Scattering Matrix in P(φ)2  Models, in Quantum Dynamics: Models and Mathematics, ed. L. Streit, Springer Verlag Wien, New York 1976
Gauge Theories on the Lattice, in  New Developments in Quantum Theory and  Statistical Mechanics, p. 173-200, ed. M. Lévy and P. Mitter (Cargèse 1976), Plenum Press New York, London 1977
Gauge Field Theories on the Lattice, Ann. Phys. 110, 440-471 (1978), with E. Seiler; reprinted in: Lattice Gauge Theories, ed. Y. Iwasaki and T. Yonega, Series of selected papers in physics, Physical Society of Japan
Lattice Gauge Theories, in Mathematical Problems in Theoretical Physics, ed. G. Dell’Antonio et al., Springer Lecture Notes in Physics, vol. 80, Springer Verlag 1978
Auf dem Weg zu einer relativistischen Quantenfeldtheorie, in Einstein Symposion Berlin,	Springer Lecture Notes in Physics, vol. 100, Springer Verlag 1979
Operators, in Encyclopedia of Physics, eds. R.G. Lerner, G.L. Trigg, Addison Wesley (1981)
Constructive Quantum Field Theories: Scalar Fields, in Gauge Theories, Fundamental Interactions and Rigorous Results, eds. P. Dita, V. Georgescu, R. Purice, Birkhäuser (1982)
Virtual Representation of Symmetric Spaces and their Analytic Continuation, Ann. of Math., 118, 461 (1983) with J. Fröhlich and E. Seiler
Constructive Quantum Field Theory: Goals, Methods, Results, Helv. Phys. Acta 59, 220 (1986)
On the convergence of  inverse functions of operators, J.Func. Anal. 81, 320 - 324, (1988), with  A. Jaffe and A. Lesniewski
Quantum K-Theory: The Chern Character, Commun. Math. Phys. 118, 1- 14 (1988), with A. Jaffe and A. Lesniewski
On super-KMS functionals and entire cyclic cohomology, K-Theory 2, 675 - 682, (1989), with  A. Jaffe and A. Lesniewski
Ward Identities for non-commutative geometry, Commun. Math. Phys. 132, 118 - 130, (1990), with A. Jaffe
Operators, in Encyclopedia of Physics, eds. R.G. Lerner, G.L. Trigg, second edition, VCH Publishers, New York, Cambridge(UK), 1991
Stability for a class of bilocal Hamiltonians, Commun. Math. Phys. 155, 183 -197, (1993), with A. Jaffe and A. Lesniewski
Supersymmetry and the stability of non-local interactions, in Differential Geometric Methods in Theoretical Physics, H.M.Ho, editor, World Scientific (1993)
Constructing Supersymmetric Quantum Field Theories, in Advances in Dynamical Systems and Quantum Physics, R. Figari, editor, World Scientific (1994)
Superspace Formulation of the Chern Character of a Theta Summable Fredholm Module, Commun. Math. Phys. 168, 643 (1995),  with A. Lesniewski
Supersymmetric Quantum Field Theory, in Constructive Results in Field Theory, Statistical Mechanics and Solid State Physics, V. Rivasseau, editor, Springer Verlag 1995
Unitary Representations of Super Groups, to appear, with A. Lesniewski
Axioms for Supersymmetric Quantum Field Theories, to appear, with A. Lesniewski
Mathematical Problems in Theoretical Physics, Springer Lecture Notes in Physics, Vol.116, Springer-Verlag 1980
Critical Phenomena, Random Systems, Gauge Theories, Parts I/II, Les Houches 1984, Session XLIII, North Holland 1986 (with R. Stora)
Akademikerproduktionsanlage GmbH? Gedanken zur Positionierung der Hochschulen, NZZ, Bildung und Erziehung, 25.Nov.1993
Lehre für die Zukunft, Bulletin der ETHZ, 261, 4 - 7, 1996
The Renaissance Engineer  in face of Unexpected Vulnerabilities, 30th SEFI Annual conference, Firenze 2002
Worldwide Trends and their Impacts, The 3rd Technology Trends Seminar Sept. 2008
Was erwartet die Wirtschaft von der Hochschulwelt, ZEIT Konferenz Hochschule und Bildung, Juli 1009
L’Università delle Nazioni Unite per il dialogo tra le culture, Milano, Università cattolica, Cerimonia per il premio Matteo Ricci

References

External links

UNESCO
Club of Rome
Pirelli Technology Award
Arthur Jaffe Harvard University
UN Press Release
ETH
ETH
ETH Campus Life
Mcgill
Millennium Technology Prize
SystemX
ETH Rector Event
Cattolica News
Matteo Ricci Prize Speech
Leonardo Da Vinci Medal
Mathematics Genealogy Project
 International association of Mathematical Physics IAMP

1942 births
Living people
Swiss physicists
Swiss officials of the United Nations
United Nations University staff
ETH Zurich alumni
Swiss mathematicians
Differential geometers
Academic staff of ETH Zurich
Theoretical physicists
Quantum physicists
Geometers
Fellows of the American Mathematical Society
People from Frauenfeld
Academic staff of Technische Universität Darmstadt
Presidents of the International Association of Mathematical Physics